Choong Family or Choong Fam as they are sometimes known, are a four-piece group originating from East London, consisting of rappers Afix and Nutz P, and singers Scandal and HT. They are best known for their single "More Murking". The group released their first album Higher Elevation in 2005.

Discography

Albums
2005: Higher Elevation
2009: Baptism of Fire

Singles
"Solitude"
"Adrenaline"
"Spray/Skank Music"
"Pain Don't stop" 
"More Murking"
"Fall Back"
"Memory Lane", peaked at number 57 on the Official Charts UK Top 75s.
"Injury Time"
"I'm Choong"

References

External links
Official site
Official Myspace

English hip hop groups
Musical groups from London
Grime music groups